The Matu District is a district in Mukah Division, Sarawak, Malaysia. Before Mukah Division was established, Matu was within Sibu Division. There are more than 20 villages in the district, with Melanau making up the majority of the population. Chinese are the second biggest population after the Melanau. The population is 21,400 in 2020. The Majlis Daerah Matu-Daro (Matu-Daro District Council) is located in Matu town. The building itself is a landmark and the biggest building in Matu. Matu District shares the same local authority with Daro District.

References

External links
 Matu & Daro District Council Official Website